The Hispasat 1B was a Spanish communications satellite operated by Hispasat. Along with the Hispasat 1A, the satellite covered communications over the American Continent for both civilian and military customers. Together they formed the first European constellation operating over the New World. Its service life ended in 2003.

Body 

Similarly to the Hispasat 1A, the body of the Hispasat 1B was based on the Eurostar E2000 bus. It consisted on a box shaped metal casing (1.7 x 1.9 x 2.21 meters) with retractable solar panels on the lateral faces (when extended measured 22.02 m) and space for the communications module on the upper and lower faces. It was built by Matra Marconi Space (now part of Airbus Defence and Space).

The satellite weighted 2,194 kg at launch and had a dry weight of 1,100 kg. It was 3 axis stabilized.

Propulsion 
The satellite was propulsed by a R-4D-11 hypergolic engine (originally developed by Marquardt Corporation for its use in the Apollo program). It was provided by Aerojet Rocketdyne and was capable of developing 490 N of thrust in vacuum. It weighed 3.76 kg.

Communications module 
The satellite offered both civilian and military communication channels for its customers. Its main module consisted of 15 active transponders: three X-band (compatible with NATO Standards) with one spare, for its military customers, and 12 Ku-band (8 at 55 W, 4 at 110 W) with six spares, for the civilian market.

The module was divided between the upper, containing the high gain antenna and lower (containing a set of low gain antennas) faces of the prism.

Launch 
The satellite was successfully launched 22 July 1993 on board an Ariane-44L H10+ from the Guiana Space Center along with the Indian satellite INSAT-2B.

Its orbit is geostationary (GEO) 30º West, around 35,800 km high (35,945.6 km of perigee and 35,953.1 km of apogee) with 12.4º of inclination, a period of 1,444.1 minutes a RCS of 7.9621 m2 and a semi-major axis of 42,320 km.

During its service life it was monitored from Hispasat's headquarters in Madrid. Its operating life officially ended on 2003 although some of its transponders remained active until 6 June 2006 when the satellite was definitely moved to a graveyard orbit.

See also 

 Hispasat 1A

References

External links 

 Hispasat (official site)

Satellites of Spain
Satellites in geostationary orbit